Eddie Elder (born February 14, 1989) is an American football defensive back who is currently a free agent. He attended Luther Burbank High School in Sacramento, California. He first enrolled at the College of San Mateo before transferring to Arizona State University. He has been a member of the Arizona Cardinals and Ottawa Redblacks.

Professional career

Arizona Cardinals
Elder was signed by the Arizona Cardinals on May 14, 2012. He was released by the Cardinals on August 24, 2012.

Ottawa Redblacks
Elder signed with the Ottawa Redblacks on December 31, 2013. He was released by the Redblacks on February 23, 2015.

References

External links
Ottawa Redblacks profile

Living people
1989 births
Players of American football from Sacramento, California
Players of Canadian football from Sacramento, California
American football safeties
Canadian football defensive backs
African-American players of American football
African-American players of Canadian football
Arizona State Sun Devils football players
Ottawa Redblacks players
San Mateo Bulldogs football players
21st-century African-American sportspeople
20th-century African-American people